Miscanthus nepalensis, Himalayan fairy grass, is a species of flowering plant in the grass family Poaceae, native to mountain slopes in China (Sichuan, Xizang, Yunnan), Bhutan, India, Myanmar and Nepal, and introduced in Malaysia.

Terminal clusters of yellow spikelets appear in summer, forming seed-heads in autumn.

It is grown as an ornamental for temperate gardens, where it requires a sunny position.

References

nepalensis
Flora of Bhutan
Flora of China
Flora of India (region)
Flora of Myanmar
Flora of Nepal
Taxa named by Eduard Hackel